Jenni N. Meno (born November 10, 1970 in Westlake, Ohio) is an American former competitive pair skater. With her husband Todd Sand, she is the 1998 World silver medalist, a two-time World bronze medalist (1995, 1996), and a three-time U.S. national champion (1994–96).

Career 
Meno first partnered with Scott Wendland and won two medals at the U.S. Championships. She began skating with her future husband Todd Sand in April 1992. They competed in two Olympics and won three national titles and three medals at the World Figure Skating Championships.

Following their amateur career, the pair skated professionally in the Stars on Ice tour for six seasons. Meno also appeared in the 2006 FOX television program "Skating with Celebrities".

Meno works as a coach with her husband. They formerly coached John Baldwin / Rena Inoue and Mary Beth Marley / Rockne Brubaker., and Jessica Calalang / Zack Sidhu.

Personal life
Meno and Sand became engaged the day of their short program at the 1994 Olympics in Lillehammer, Norway. They were married July 22, 1995. They have two sons, Jack, born in 2004, and Matthew Kenneth, born on August 14, 2006.

Competitive highlights

Ladies' singles

Pairs

With Todd Sand

With Scott Wendland

References

Navigation

American female pair skaters
Olympic figure skaters of the United States
Figure skaters at the 1992 Winter Olympics
Figure skaters at the 1994 Winter Olympics
Figure skaters at the 1998 Winter Olympics
Living people
1970 births
World Figure Skating Championships medalists
People from Westlake, Ohio
21st-century American women